Sikandar Shah Suri (died 1559) was the sixth ruler of the Sur dynasty, a late medieval Pashtun dynasty of northern India. He became the sultan of Delhi after overthrowing Ibrahim Shah Suri.

Early life
Sikandar Shah Suri's actual name was Ahmad Khan Suri. He was the brother-in-law of sultan Muhammad Adil Shah. He was the governor of Lahore before declaring independence from Delhi in 1555.

Reign
After becoming the independent sultan and bringing Punjab under control, he marched towards the territory controlled by sultan Ibrahim Shah Suri. Ibrahim was defeated in a battle at Farah, India near Agra and Sikandar took possession of both Delhi and Agra. While Sikandar was busy with his struggle against Ibrahim, Humayun captured Lahore in February 1555. Another detachment of his forces captured Dipalpur. Next, the Mughal army occupied Jalandhar and their advanced division proceeded towards Sirhind. Sikandar sent a force of 30,000 horses but they were defeated by the Mughal army in a battle at Machhiwara and Sirhind was occupied by the Mughals. Sikandar, then led an army of 80,000 horses himself and met the Army at Sirhind. On 22 June 1555 he was defeated by the Mughal army and was compelled to retreat to the Sivalik Hills in northern Punjab. The victorious Mughals marched to Delhi and occupied it.

Later days
In late 1556, Sikandar became active again. He defeated Mughal general Khizr Khwaja Khan at Chamiari (presently in Amritsar district) and began to collect taxes with Kalanaur as his headquarters. Bairam Khan sent Khan Alam (Iskandar Khan) to assist Khizr Khwaja Khan and finally on 7 December 1556 Akbar along with Bairam Khan left Delhi to deal with him. Sikandar again retreated to the Sivaliks and took refuge in fort Mau under Nurpur kingdom . After six months of resistance from the besieged fort, Sikandar surrendered the fort on 25 July 1557. His local supporter Raja Bakht Mal was beheaded by Bairam Khan  and he was sent to Bihar where he died in 1559.

Notes

Sur Empire
Indian people of Pashtun descent
1559 deaths
16th-century Indian Muslims
16th-century Indian monarchs
Year of birth missing
1555 in India